Bogdan Kominowski (born 22 April 1945) is a New Zealand former pop star and actor. He is also known by his stage name, Mr. Lee Grant. He has had a successful singing and acting career, having starred in stage shows such as Jesus Christ Superstar and Elvis, television shows, and the James Bond movie A View to a Kill.

Early life
Kominowski was born in a Nazi German concentration camp just outside of Düsseldorf, to Polish parents. His father died in the camp, but he and his mother survived and in 1949, emigrated to New Zealand where they settled in Palmerston North.

He left school in 1963 and enrolled at Palmerston North Teachers College, after which he taught at West End School.  While there he displayed considerable talent not only as a musician and singer, but also an artist.  One particular teacher (Mrs. M. Foster) was so delighted with the friezes he drew around the top of her blackboard that she made a considerable effort to retain them even after he left teaching.  He was well-liked by all his pupils and fellow teachers.

His first interest in music came when he joined a local band called The Cyclones.

A friend knew a DJ called Keith Richardson, who ran youth dances in the Hawkes Bay area, and he managed to get him some gigs there. Keith decided that Bogdan Kominowski was a bit of a handful. However, it was Sylvia Richardson, Keith's wife, who came up with a new name, Lee Grant (Ref: Never a Dull Moment by Keith Richardson – see p67 – this was an autobiography.) The Mr was added to avoid confusion with an Auckland actress Miss Lee Grant (there is also a US actress of that name).

Mr Lee Grant's first recording was "Doo-Doodle-Do-Doo"/"As Long As I Have You" on Viscount in 1965. To promote the record, he travelled to Auckland for an appearance on Teen Scene. It was while doing that show, he met reporter, Dianne Cadwallader. She decided to become his manager and groomed the 21-year-old as a presentable soloist. Dianne secured guest spots at Teenarama in Wellington and a recording contract with HMV.
She had him dressed by a Wellington fashion mogul and he quickly became New Zealand's Mr. Mod.  After two unsuccessful singles, Dianne managed to get him a spot on the hit New Zealand music show, C'Mon.

Music career

C'mon

The producer, Kevin Moore, was impressed and contracted Mr. Lee Grant as resident vocalist on C'Mon.
During 1966–67 he went on three brief tours around New Zealand as a support artist to the Sandy Edmonds, Roy Orbison, The Walker Brothers and The Yardbirds package. This gave him quite a high level of exposure by the time C'Mon kicked off in February 1967.

Towards the end of the first C'Mon series HMV released the single "Opportunity", which entered the National Charts at number 17. By the time Mr. Lee Grant had completed the Animals, Dave Dee, Dozy, Beaky, Mick and Tich tour five weeks later, "Opportunity" was at number one on the charts in May 1967.

His next single "Thanks To You" was released in September 1967 just prior to the "Golden Disc Spectacular".
"Thanks To You" also made it to number one on the National Charts and collected the 1967 Loxene Golden Disc award. To complete a magnificent year, Mr. Lee Grant also picked up the NEBOA Award for "Entertainer of the Year"

A new single "Movin' Away" in December 1967 stalled at the number two position. Then with a failure for the next – "Ave Maria" – not even making the charts, he was rescued by the follow-up single "Why Or Where Or When", which had him back at number one in March 1968, just as Mr Lee Grant was preparing to leave for Britain.

London
On 3 March 1968, the biggest male star since Johnny Devlin flew out of Auckland bound for London. In his absence, he scored two more Top 10 hits in New Zealand. In June 1968 "Rivers Run Dry" reached number 5 and "Bless You" reached number 6 in August.

Being away from his adoring fans, his popularity soon plummeted, and his record sales came to a halt. He did release some singles in England, however, as Lee Grant, but none of them were successful.

Resurgence through acting
Success as a pop star in England was never realised, so he turned to stage, TV and film under his birth name.  He played roles in Jesus Christ Superstar, Elvis, and TV shows such as the revival of Oh Boy and Brushstrokes.

In 1993 he appeared in the title role of the Australia/New Zealand production of Ken Hill's 1976 Phantom of the Opera musical (best known as being the inspiration for Andrew Lloyd Webber's better-known version).

With Frankie Stevens, he is one of two New Zealand singing stars to have appeared in a James Bond movie. He played the part of a KGB agent in A View to a Kill.

Discography

In 2001 EMI released a CD called The Very Best of Mr Lee Grant.

Singles

Albums 

"Mr. Lee Grant" (#1, 1967)

 Havah Nagilah
 You Can Have Her
 The Real Thing
 Some Kinda Magic
 Coloured Lights
 Opportunity
 Yo Yo
 Take My Hand
 Love
 The Coalman
 Spicks and Specks
 Thanks To You

"Mr. Lee in London" (#3, 1968)

 Tabatha Twitchit
 To Make A Big Man Cry
 Stop! In the Name of Love
 Walkin' With My Angel
 Maria
 Why or Where or When
 You Don't Have to Say You Love Me
 Big Man
 The Wanderer
 Tossin' and Turnin'
 Do You Mind?
 Big Boots

"The Very Best of Mr. Lee Grant" (2001)

 Opportunity
 Tabatha Twitchet
 Spicks and Specks
 Thanks To You
 To Make A Big Man Cry
 Movin' Away
 Maria
 Why or Where Or When
 Rivers Run Dry
 You Don't Have to Say You Love Me
 Bless You
 Take My Hand
 Some Kinda Magic
 Do You Mind?
 The Coalman
 Big Man
 Walkin' With My Angel
 Tossin' and Turnin'
 Havah Nagilah
 Big Boots

Partial filmography

See also
 Johnny Devlin

References

External links
 Sergent.com.au
 

1945 births
Living people
New Zealand pop singers
New Zealand male musical theatre actors
Polish emigrants to New Zealand